John B. Helston (born October 30, 1939) is a Canadian curler and curling coach. He won the  playing second on the Mike Riley rink. He also won the 1991 Canadian Senior Curling Championships and the 2004 Canadian Masters Curling Championships, and was runner up at the 1998 Canadian Senior Curling Championships. He coached team Jennifer Jones at her first Hearts appearance in 2002.  

At the time of the 1984 Brier, he was employed as a communications consultant for MTS.  Helston was a member of the Riley rink until 1985 when he went to work in Saudi Arabia for a year.

Awards
Ross Harstone Sportsmanship Award: .

Teams

Record as a coach of national teams

References

External links 

 John Helston – Curling Canada Stats Archive
 "Riley Appreciates Rest, Wendorf" - The Phoenix, April 7, 1984
 "Riley Finally Emerges" - The Leader Post, March 12, 1984 (section B, page B1)

1939 births
Living people
Brier champions
Canadian expatriate sportspeople in Saudi Arabia
Canadian male curlers
Curlers from Manitoba
Canadian curling coaches
Place of birth missing (living people)